Wennington is a railway station on the Bentham Line, which runs between  and  via . It is owned by Network Rail and managed by Northern Trains.

History

Thereafter it became a busy junction, with many passenger trains calling to detach through carriages for Carnforth from the main Morecambe portion if heading west or attaching them if heading east - a bay platform was provided at the east end of the station for this purpose, along with several sidings on the opposite side of the line for locomotive and carriage stabling (all since removed, along with the extra platform line). A number of local services (mainly from the Carnforth line) also originated or terminated there.

Much of this activity ended with the withdrawal of local stopping trains on the Carnforth line in 1960 (though it remained in use for through services) and the closure of the Lancaster line to passengers in January 1966. The latter was then closed to all traffic the following year and subsequently lifted, although the abandoned trackbed can still be seen. The original station buildings have also been demolished and replaced by shelters, although the signal box remained in use as the last remaining block post on the line until 1988 – it was then closed & permanently "switched out" but was not formally abolished and removed until 2006.

Accidents and incidents 
The junction was the site of a derailment on 11 August 1880 in which eight people were killed.

Facilities
The station is unstaffed and has no ticket-buying facilities. Passengers therefore must purchase these on the train or in advance of their journey. Train running information is provided by telephone and information posters. Step-free access is limited to the eastbound platform, as the westbound one can only be reached by footbridge.

Services

On Sundays there were four services in each direction all year round since the May 2011 timetable change - prior to this the first two departures each way ran only during the summer months.

From the start of the May 2018 summer timetable, additional services have been introduced. Seven trains each way run to Lancaster and Skipton, with three of the former continuing to Morecambe and six of the latter to Leeds (though the direct train to and from Heysham has ceased). One additional train each way runs on Sundays. As of May 2019, one further service has been introduced each way, to bring the weekday frequency to eight in each direction. Five of these run to/from Morecambe.

References

Sources

 Binns, D. (1982), The Little North Western Railway, Wyvern Publications, Skipton, .

External links
 

Railway stations in Lancaster
DfT Category F2 stations
Former Midland Railway stations
Railway stations in Great Britain opened in 1849
Northern franchise railway stations